Marsoui is a village municipality in the Gaspésie–Îles-de-la-Madeleine region of Quebec, Canada.

The name Marsoui is thought to originate from the Mi'kmaq word malseoui, meaning "flint" which is abundant in the area. However, another theory explains that it comes from the French word marsouin, the vernacular term for porpoise or beluga whale that used to be present in the Gulf of Saint Lawrence in large numbers. Alternate spellings used over time were Marsouis, Marsoin, and Marsouins.

History

While the beluga hunt and cod fishing was popular in this area during the late 17th century, it was not until 1836 that the first permanent settlers, the Henley family of Mont-Louis, arrived. They were followed by people from Jersey.

In 1890, the Mission of Sainte-Émélie-de-Marsoui was founded there, and 3 years later, the local post office opened. Subsistence fishing was the main economic activity until 1911. Then a small saw mill was built that started the transformation to a forestry-based economy. Over the following decades, several saw mills burnt down and were rebuilt.

During the Prohibition era in the United States, Marsoui was a favorite hideout for smugglers fleeing the Royal Canadian Mounted Police.

In 1923, the villages of Marsoui and Rivière-à-la-Marthe separated from the municipality of Sainte-Anne-des-Monts to form the Township Municipality of Christie. In turn, Marsoui separated from this township in 1950 to be incorporated as a village municipality. Its first mayor was Alphonse Couturier, whose company had built a large saw mill in Marsoui in 1940.

Demographics 

Mother tongue language (2016)

Economy
The primary industry of Marsoui is forestry. The Bois Marsoui GDS mill supports 60% of its population. There is also a small tourism industry, including 2 commercial sugar houses. Other businesses provide local commercial and public services.

See also
 List of village municipalities in Quebec

References

Incorporated places in Gaspésie–Îles-de-la-Madeleine
Villages in Quebec